Llancanelo Lake (Spanish: Laguna de Llancanelo) is a wetland with an area of 650 km2 located in the Malargüe Department in the south of Mendoza Province, Argentina, 75 km from the city of Malargüe, at 1,280 m above mean sea level, within the arid region near the Andes in the limit between the regions of Cuyo and Patagonia.

Llancanelo Lake is a provincial nature reserve. It hosts a variety of bird species, including flamingos, black-necked swans, herons and ducks. The lake is also a Ramsar Convention site (RS #759) since 8 November 1995.

References

 Laguna de Llancanelo — Information sheet on Ramsar Wetlands.
  Laguna de Llancanelo at PatrimonioNatural.com.

Lakes of Mendoza Province
Ramsar sites in Argentina
Nature reserves in Argentina
Wetlands of Argentina
Protected areas of Mendoza Province